Plesioptopoma curvidens is a species of armored catfish native to Brazil, where it is known to occur in the Rio Paraopeba, a tributary of the Rio São Francisco. It is the only species in the genus Plesioptopoma.

References

Loricariidae
Fish of South America
Fish of Brazil
Taxa named by Roberto Esser dos Reis
Monotypic ray-finned fish genera
Catfish genera